Chest Township can refer to two places in the U.S. state of Pennsylvania:
Chest Township, Cambria County, Pennsylvania
Chest Township, Clearfield County, Pennsylvania

Pennsylvania township disambiguation pages